The Military ranks of Sudan are the military insignia used by the Sudanese Armed Forces. Being a former colony of United Kingdom, Sudan shares a rank structure similar to that of the United Kingdom.

Commissioned officer ranks
The rank insignia of commissioned officers.

Other ranks
The rank insignia of non-commissioned officers and enlisted personnel.

References

External links
 

Sudan
Military of Sudan